The South Australian Railways 740 class was a class of 2-8-2 freight locomotives built by Clyde Engineering, Granville for the South Australian Railways in 1951-1952.

History
In the late 1940s, the Federal Government placed an order with Clyde Engineering, Granville for fifty 2-8-2 locomotives. These were ordered as part of Australia's contribution to the United Nations Relief and Rehabilitation Administration rehabilitation of China. With the first locomotives under construction, China fell to the Communists and Australia's obligations ceased.

The government was able to renegotiate the contract, with only twenty built. Ten were taken by the Commonwealth Railways as the L class, with the other ten going to the South Australian Railways as the 740 class after being converted for broad gauge operation. The 740 class remained in service until the early 1960s when replaced by diesels. The last was condemned in November 1965.

References

External links

Clyde Engineering locomotives
Railway locomotives introduced in 1951
740
2-8-2 locomotives
Broad gauge locomotives in Australia
Scrapped locomotives
Freight locomotives